The 1903 Swarthmore Quakers football team was an American football team that represented Swarthmore College as an independent during the 1903 college football season. The team compiled a 6–4 record and outscored opponents by a total of 99 to 67. George H. Brooke was the head coach.

Schedule

References

Swarthmore
Swarthmore Garnet Tide football seasons
Swarthmore Quakers football